Edwige Fenech (born 24 December 1948) is a French-Italian actress and film producer. She is mostly known as the star of a series of commedia sexy all'italiana and giallo films released in the 1970s, which turned her into a sex symbol.

Biography
Fenech was born in Bône, Constantine, French Algeria (now Annaba, Annaba Province, Algeria) to a Maltese father and Sicilian mother.

Cinema career
Fenech moved from Nice, France, to Rome in 1967 for her first Italian film Samoa, Queen of the Jungle by Guido Malatesta. In 1968, she came under contract with Austrian director Franz Antel and from the late 1960s to early 1970s, she acted in various films of Antel (including his acclaimed Frau Wirtin series) as well as that of Franz Marischka.

Fenech starred in many genres of cinema but her greatest commercial success came with commedia sexy all'italiana films, particularly including earlier works Ubalda, All Naked and Warm (1972) and Giovannona Long-Thigh (1973), as well as the following l'insegnante (school teacher), la soldatessa (soldier), la poliziotta (policewoman) series and other films that featured Fenech in stereotypical professions, which further bolstered Fenech's position as the most popular actress of the genre. She often paired with Carlo Giuffrè and later with Renzo Montagnani in commedia sexy films.

Fenech was also a regular in giallo films. Her works in this genre include The Seducers (1969), Five Dolls for an August Moon (1970), The Strange Vice of Mrs. Wardh (1971), Your Vice Is a Locked Room and Only I Have the Key (1972), All the Colors of the Dark (1972), The Case of the Bloody Iris (1972), Strip Nude for Your Killer (1975), and Phantom of Death (1987).

Later career
In the 1980s, she became a television personality, typically appearing with Barbara Bouchet on a chat show on Italian television. After many years of work in movie production, she co-produced The Merchant of Venice (2004) with Al Pacino, and later accepted Eli Roth's offer to star in another movie, Hostel: Part II (2007). Quentin Tarantino named the character of Lt. Ed Fenech in Inglourious Basterds (2009) in her honour, and invited Fenech to the Italian premiere of his film.

Personal life
Fenech was married to Italian film producer Luciano Martino from 1971 to 1979. 

In the mid-1990s, she was engaged to the well-known Italian industrialist Luca di Montezemolo. Her son Edwin (born 1971) has worked at her production company and was the former CEO of Ferrari Asia-Pacific, Ferrari Greater China and Ferrari North America.

In popular culture 
The English Metal band Cathedral wrote the song "Edwige's Eyes" on their album "The Guessing Game" as a tribute to the actress.

Filmography

References

Further reading
 Stefano Loparco, Il corpo dei Settanta. Il corpo, l'immagine e la maschera di Edwige Fenech, Il Foglio Letterario, 2009. .

External links
 
 Interview with Fenech, by Luigi Cozzi, from around 1970
 Edwige Fenech Movie poster images
 Edwige Fenech fan club

1948 births
Italian film actresses
French film actresses
Living people
Italian people of Maltese descent
French people of Italian descent
French people of Maltese descent
French people of Sicilian descent
French emigrants to Italy
Italian television personalities
People from Annaba
Pieds-Noirs